Mohamed Saliou Camara (born 5 August 1996) is a Guinean footballer.

Career statistics

International

References

1996 births
Living people
Guinean footballers
Guinea international footballers
Association football midfielders
Fello Star players
Guinea A' international footballers
2018 African Nations Championship players